Oakwell Hospital was originally a fever hospital built on a hill top in Birstall in West Riding of Yorkshire, England, caring for chiefly people with scarlet fever and diphtheria. From 1948 it catered for the elderly and in 1962, the elderly were transferred out as a smallpox outbreak in Bradford necessitated it to be designated for the isolation of cases of smallpox.

References 

Hospitals in West Yorkshire
Birstall, West Yorkshire
Fever hospitals